Doğanca is a village in the Pervari District of Siirt Province in Turkey. The village is populated by Kurds of the Botikan tribe and had a population of 152 in 2021.

Notable people 

 Şeyh Abdurrahman Garisi

References 

Villages in Pervari District
Kurdish settlements in Siirt Province